Cordia alliodora is a species of flowering tree in the borage family, Boraginaceae, that is native to the American tropics. It is commonly known as Spanish elm, Ecuador laurel, cypre or salmwood. It can reach 35 m in height.

Uses
Cordia alliodora is one of several Cordia trees called bocote in Spanish and its wood, which has very little figure, is usually called freijo or jennywood along with that of Cordia goeldiana.  The wood is used for boat decking, furniture, cabinetry, guitar/bass building by luthiers, and sometimes substitutes for mahogany or teak.

Environmental aspects
Outside of its indigenous range, Cordia alliodora has been identified as a problematic invasive species.
For example, a timber-focused planting program of the species in Vanuatu during the mid-1970s has over time proved disruptive to native ecosystems and communities.  The species has been described as a severe environmental nuisance, as it has overtaken natural forests by multiplying at a faster rate than being harvested, and has become susceptible to outbreaks of a form of root rot known as Phellinus noxius.

References

alliodora
Plants described in 1841
Myrmecophytes
Trees of Bolivia
Trees of Brazil
Trees of the Caribbean
Trees of Central America
Trees of Colombia
Trees of Ecuador
Trees of Mexico
Trees of Peru
Trees of northern South America
Trees of Guatemala
Flora without expected TNC conservation status